Kettershausen (Swabian: Kettershausa) is a municipality in the district of Unterallgäu in Bavaria, Germany. The town has a municipal association with Babenhausen, Bavaria.

Notable people
 Joseph Siegmund Bachmann (1754–1825), organist and composer, was born in Kettershausen

References

Unterallgäu